The Royal Sessions is a studio album by Paul Rodgers of Free and Bad Company fame. Released on 4 February 2014, it consists of ten covers of blues, rhythm & blues and soul songs recorded at Royal Studios in Memphis, Tennessee with local musicians and produced by Perry A. Margouleff. Rodgers chose songs for the album that inspired him in his youth.

Rodgers announced before the album's release that he would be donating all proceeds from it to the Stax Music Academy, an after-school music programme in Memphis, stating that he wanted to "pay the proceeds to the people who gave us this music".

The album entered the Billboard Blues Albums chart at number one, and debuted on the Billboard 200 at number 81.

Reception

Steven Thomas Erlewine, reviewing the album for AllMusic, describes it as "enjoyable". Glide magazine awarded it 8/10. USA Today gave it three stars out of four, with Jerry Shriver saying that "Rodgers' devotion rings true". The Winnipeg Sun gave it two and a half stars, describing it as "Enjoyable, but not essential." Le Parisien writer Michel Valentin viewed the familiarity of the songs as a drawback.

Track listing

The vinyl version of this album does not contain "Born Under a Bad Sign"
Amazon Exclusive includes three bonus tracks – "Shake", "Walk In My Shadow" and "Wonderful World"

Personnel

 Paul Rodgers – vocals
 Michael Toles – guitar
 Leroy Hodges – bass
 Michael Barar – viola
 Roy Brewer – violin
 Marc Franklin – trumpet
 Charles Hodges – Hammond B3
 Wesley Hovanec – assistant engineer, electric bongos, videography
 Jonathan Kirkscey – cello
 Beth Luscombe – viola
 Perry Margouleff – guitar, mixing, producer
 Lannie McMillan – tenor saxophone
 Susanna Perry-Gilmore – violin
 Jessie Munson – violin
 Royal horns – featured artist, horn
 Lester Snell – piano
 Gary Topper – tenor saxophone
 Archie Turner – Wurlitzer
 Mark Wallace – cello
 The Royal Singers – strings
 James L. Spake – baritone sax
 James Robertson – drums
 Steve Potts – drums
 Daniel Bean – assistant engineer
 Ryan Smith – mastering 
 William Wittman – engineer, mixing

Charts

References

2014 albums
Paul Rodgers albums